The Kheireddine Tunisian International School (KTIS) is a private international school located in the city of Tunis, in Tunisia. Founded in 2013, the school hosts students from over 12 countries from kindergarten to 7th grade (ages 4–13). They are opening a new grade each year, and they are planning to have all grades by the end of 2020. The official language and language of instruction of the school is English. French and Arabic are offered as a second language.

Facilities
The School is housed in a purpose-built building. Facilities include library, science laboratory, IT lab, specialist rooms for music and art. All classes are equipped with activeboard.

References

External links
 The Kheireddine Tunisian International School

Schools in Tunis